Yaesu is a Japanese brand of commercial and amateur radio equipment, founded as  in 1959 by a Japanese radio amateur Sako Hasegawa (call sign JA1MP) in Yaesu, Japan, a district of Tokyo.

History 
Yaesu had initially been formed with the intention to develop and manufacture commercial and amateur radio transceivers for the Japanese market, but only five years after its formation the company had signed foreign sales agreements for export to Australia and Germany.

In Europe, the equipment was sold under the Yaesu brand and the Sommerkamp brand. In 1963 the Swiss firm Sommerkamp imported Yaesu equipment and sold it using their own brand.

Yaesu's line of equipment was first imported into the US by Spectronics, Inc. located in Signal Hill, California, in 1965. Yaesu became an important presence in the U.S. amateur radio market with the introduction and improvement of its very popular FT-101 line of equipment in the 1970s. In addition, transceiver manufacture was outsourced to Henry Radio in Los Angeles. 

Sako Hasegawa (JA1MP) died in 1993. Following her death, Jun Hasegawa took over as managing director.

In 2007, Motorola announced its intention to purchase 80% of Vertex Standard and form a joint venture with Tokogiken (a privately held Japanese
company controlled by Jun Hasegawa), which would hold the other 20%. This deal was completed in January 2008.  The joint venture was dissolved effective January 1, 2012.  The Vertex Standard land mobile division operates as a wholly-owned subsidiary headquartered in Tokyo, Japan.  The Amateur Radio, Airband and Marine Radio business was transferred to the new company "Yaesu Musen".

Digimode "Fusion" 

Unlike analog radio modes (like FM or AM), digital modes utilize a narrower radio bandwidth. In the early 2000’s, minimum-shift keying (GMSK) technology emerged in the amateur radio market as the dominant digital mode. In 2013 Yaesu introduced “System Fusion,” a new technology utilizing C4FM 4-level FSK technology for transmitting digital voice data. 

System Fusion provides a simpler, more ham radio-friendly setup. Devices using this standard are capable of analyzing an incoming signal to determine whether a C4FM or conventional FM mode is being used. System Fusion provides data transfer at full rate with speeds up to 9600 Bits-per-second.

Yaesu is the only company with System Fusion-enabled devices. ICOM has, in contrast, developed devices using Japan Amateur Radio League and D-STAR modes. Other brands use DMR, among other modes.

Products
The following list contains a timeline of Yaesu device releases.

High-fidelity audio systems
 Yaesu YQ-41 (Quadraphonic stereo receiver) (1972)
 Yaesu YQ-41-IV (Quadraphonic stereo receiver) (1973)
 Yaesu YQ-60 (Quadraphonic stereo receiver) (circa 1975)

Receivers

 FR-50(B) (HF amateur band receiver)
 FR-101 (HF amateur band receiver)
 FRdx-400 (HF amateur band receiver)
 FRdx-500 (HF amateur band receiver)
 FRG-7 (HF communications receiver)
 FRG-100 (HF communications receiver)
 FRG-7000 (HF communications receiver)
 FRG-7700 (HF communications receiver) – An HF receiver for the radio amateur and for the commercial market.  It is a metal-cased receiver with a polymer front and it is suitable for reception in the AM, FM, CW and SSB modes. Its frequency coverage is from 150 kHz – 30.0 MHz continuously in 30 switchable band segments. Its frequency readout is available in a traditional analog (dish) mode as well as in a digital display mode.  Called a “budget receiver”, the FRG-7700 was released in 1978 as successor to the FRG-7000 and priced at approximately US$450. This type was in production until 1982. The FRG-7700 is a superheterodyne type receiver going up to 48 MHz in the Intermediate Frequency trap, followed by a fully synthesized local oscillator in the 1st and 2nd mixer unit and thus creating a VFO that is reasonably stable after warm-up.
 FRG-8800 (HF communications receiver)
 FRG-9600 (VHF/UHF receiver/scanner)
 VR-120 (Hand-held wideband communications receiver)
 VR-500 (Hand-held wideband communications receiver)
 VR-5000 (Base wideband communications receiver)

Amateur radio transceivers (HF)

 Yaesu FT-One  (HF transceiver)
 FT-100 (HF transceiver)
 FT-101  (HF transceiver)
 FT-102 (HF transceiver)
 FT-107M (HF transceiver)
 FT-200 (HF transceiver)
 FT-201 (HF transceiver)
 FT-250 (HF transceiver)
 FT-301 (HF transceiver)
 FT-301S (HF transceiver)
 FT-301D (HF transceiver)
 FT-DX-400 (HF transceiver)
 FT-450 (HF/VHF transceiver)
 FT-501 (HF transceiver)
 FT-600 (HF transceiver)
 FT-650 (HF transceiver)
 FT-7(B) (HF transceiver)
 FT-75 (HF transceiver)
 FT-77 (S) (HF transceiver)
 FT-707 (S) (HF transceiver)
 FT-726R (HF/VHF/UHF transceiver)
 FT-747/GX (HF transceiver)
 FT-757/GX (HF transceiver)
 FT-757/GXII (HF transceiver)
 FT-767/GX (HF-VHF-UHF transceiver)
 FT-817  (HF/VHF/UHF transceiver)
 FT-818  (HF/VHF/UHF transceiver)
 FT-840 (HF transceiver)
 FT-847 (HF/VHF/UHF transceiver)
 FT-857  (HF/VHF/UHF transceiver)
 FT-890 (HF transceiver)
 FT-891 (HF transceiver)
 FT-897  (HF/VHF/UHF transceiver)
 FT-900 (HF transceiver)
 FT-901 (HF transceiver)
 FT-902 (HF transceiver)
 FT-920 (HF transceiver)
 FT-950 (HF transceiver)
 FT-990 (HF transceiver)
 FT-991 (HF transceiver)
 FT-1000MP (HF transceiver)
 FT-1000/D (HF transceiver)
 FT-1200 (HF transceiver)
 FT-2000 (HF/VHF transceiver)
 FTDX-10 (HF/6-meter band transceiver)
 FTDX-101D and FTDX-101MP (HF/6-meter band transceivers)
 FTDX-1200 (HF/VHF transceiver)
 FTDX-3000 (HF/VHF transceiver)
 FTDX-5000 (HF transceiver)
 FT-8900R (HF/VHF/UHF transceiver)
 FTDX-9000 (HF/VHF transceiver)
 FTDX-9000 Contest (HF/VHF transceiver)
 FTDX-9000D (HF/VHF transceiver)
 FTDX-9000MP (HF/VHF transceiver)
 FTDX-101D (HF/VHF transceiver)
 FTDX-101MP (HF/VHF transceiver)

Amateur radio transceivers (VHF/UHF)

 FT-207R (VHF transceiver)
 FT-221  (VHF transceiver)
 FT-720R (VHF/UHF transceiver)
 FT-2600M (VHF/UHF transceiver)
 FT-2800M (VHF transceiver)
 FT-3000M (VHF transceiver)
 FT-1802M (VHF transceiver)
 FT-1907R (UF transceiver)
 FT-290R (VHF transceiver)
 FT-2400 (VHF transceiver)
 FT-2700R (VHF/UHF Mobile)
 FT-2900R (VHF transceiver)
 FTM-200D (VHF/UHF transceiver)
 FTM-300D (VHF/UHF transceiver)
 FTM-350R (VHF/UHF transceiver)
 FTM-400D (VHF/UHF transceiver)
 FTM-500D (VHF/UHF transceiver)
 FTM-100D (VHF/UHF transceiver)
 FTM-3200D (VHF transceiver)
 FTM-3207D (UHF transceiver)
 FT-4700RH (VHF/UHF transceiver)
 FT-5100 (VHF/UHF transceiver)
 FT-5200 (VHF/UHF transceiver)
 FT-690R  (50 MHz transceiver)
 FT-736R (VHF/UHF transceiver)
 FTM-6000R (VHF/UHF transceiver)
FTM-7250D (VHF/UHF transceiver)
 FT-7800R (VHF/UHF transceiver)
 FT-8000 (VHF/UHF transceiver)
 FT-8100 (VHF/UHF transceiver)
 FT-8500 (VHF/UHF transceiver)
 FT-8800R (VHF/UHF transceiver)
 FT-8900R (VHF/UHF quad-band transceiver)
 FT-90 (VHF/UHF transceiver)

Handheld transceivers (VHF/UHF)

 FT-11R (VHF transceiver)
FT-41R (UHF transceiver)
FT-4XR (VHF/UHF transceiver)
 FT-25R (VHF transceiver)
 FT-41R (UHF transceiver)
 FT-50R (VHF/UHF transceiver)
FT-60R (VHF/UHF transceiver)
 FT-250R (VHF transceiver)
 FT-270R (VHF transceiver)
 FT-277R (UHF transceiver)
 FT-51R (VHF/UHF transceiver)
 FT-60R (VHF/UHF transceiver)
 FT-65R (VHF/UHF transceiver)
 FT-70D (VHF/UHF transceiver)
 FT-73R  (UHF transceiver)
 FT-411(E) (UHF transceiver)
 VX-1R (VHF/UHF transceiver)
 VX-2R (VHF/UHF transceiver)
 VX-3R (VHF/UHF transceiver)
 VX-5R (VHF/UHF transceiver)
 VX-6R (VHF/UHF transceiver)
 VX-7R (VHF/UHF transceiver)
 VX-8R (VHF/UHF transceiver)
 VX-8DR (VHF/UHF transceiver)
 VX-8GR (VHF/UHF transceiver)
 VX-110 (VHF transceiver)
 VX-120 (VHF transceiver)
 VX-127 (UHF transceiver)
 VX-150 (VHF transceiver)
 VX-170 (VHF transceiver)
 VX-177 (UHF transceiver)
 VX-250 (VHF transceiver)
 VX-270 (VHF transceiver)
 FT-23 (VHF transceiver)
 FT-470 (VHF/UHF transceiver)
 FT1D (VHF/UHF transceiver)
 FT2D (VHF/UHF transceiver)
FT-3DR (VHF/UHF transceiver)
FT-5D (VHF/UHF transceiver)
 FT-530 (VHF/UHF transceiver)

Antenna Rotators
 G-1000DXA (Antenna rotator)
 G-2800DXA (Antenna rotator)
 G-450A (Antenna rotator)
 G-550 (Antenna rotator)
 G-5400 (Antenna rotator)
 G-5500 (Antenna rotator)
 G-5600 (Antenna rotator)
 G-600 (Antenna rotator)
 G-650 (Antenna rotator)
 G-800 (Antenna rotator)
 G-800DXA (Antenna rotator)
 G-800SA (Antenna rotator)

References

External links

Yaesu.com
Vertex Standard
Vertex website catering for Europe, the Middle East and Africa

Electronics companies of Japan
Amateur radio companies
Engineering companies based in Tokyo
Manufacturing companies based in Tokyo
Electronics companies established in 1959
1959 establishments in Japan
Japanese brands